Barry Clyde Nelson  was an Australian rugby league footballer who played in the 1950s. He played for the Newtown and Canterbury-Bankstown clubs.

Nelson played five seasons of first grade rugby league with the Canterbury-Bankstown Bulldogs between 1954-1955 and 1959-1961 and is listed as the Bulldogs' player No.196. He spent a year or two captain-coaching in Gilgandra in 1956-57 before returning to the Bulldogs. He represented New South Wales on one occasion in 1959 and finished his career at Newtown Jets for two seasons between 1962 and 1963.

During the 1980s and 1990s, Nelson was club president of the Canterbury-Bankstown Bulldogs. He and secretary Peter Moore, oversaw a very successful 1980s, yielding 4 premierships and as a stable committee, oversaw the Bulldogs' success into the 1990s. He was club president from 1982 to 2002.

In the 2002 Queen's Birthday Honours Nelson was awarded the medal of the Order of Australia for "service to Rugby League football, particularly through the Bulldogs League Club".

Nelson died in May 2021.

References

1932 births
2021 deaths
Australian rugby league players
Newtown Jets players
Canterbury-Bankstown Bulldogs players
Australian rugby league administrators
New South Wales rugby league team players
Recipients of the Medal of the Order of Australia
Rugby league props